Together is the debut album by S Club Juniors. It was released in 2002 and went to number 5 on the UK Albums Chart. The album has been certified Platinum by the BPI.

The track "One Step Closer" was also released by another 19 Management act, American Juniors. "You Are the One" is a rewritten version of "From All of Us" by Girl Thing.

Track listing

Charts

Weekly charts

Year-end charts

Certifications

References

2002 debut albums
S Club 8 albums
Polydor Records albums